The Barnsdall Independent School District is a school district based in Barnsdall, Oklahoma United States.

See also
List of school districts in Oklahoma

References

External links
 Barnsdall School District
 Barnsdall Overview

School districts in Oklahoma
Education in Osage County, Oklahoma